Tableau Ferraille is a 1997 Senegalese film written and directed by Moussa Sene Absa.  Set in a seaside town near Dakar called Tableau Ferraille, or "Scrap Heap," the film depicts the political career of ambitious Daam, played by Ismaël Lô, who strives to save his town from the chaos which embroils much of Africa.

References
 Dembrow, Michael (October 1999). Tableau Ferraille. Michael Dembrow's Page.  Retrieved on 2007-11-26.

External links

1997 films
Senegalese comedy-drama films
Films directed by Moussa Sene Absa
Films by Serer directors
Films set in Senegal
1997 comedy-drama films